Bing is a CGI-animated children's television series based on the books by Ted Dewan. The series follows a pre-school bunny named Bing as he experiences everyday issues and conundrums. 

It airs on CBeebies in the UK and Ireland and S4C in Wales. In the United States, the series started airing on the Cartoonito block on September 13, 2021 on Cartoon Network, with an American voice cast, replacing their original British voices.

Characters
 Bing (voiced by Elliot Kerley in series 1 and Rafferty Railton in series 2 of the original version, Santino Barnard in the American English dub) is the titular protagonist of the programme. Bing is a 3-year-old black anthropomorphic bunny. His favourite toy is Hoppity Voosh, a rabbit superhero. Bing wears a green shirt, red and black chequered dungarees and black and white sneakers and Bing loves to hum, whistle, pretend and do untroubling childlike things. 
 Flop (voiced by Mark Rylance in series 1 and David Threlfall in series 2) is Bing's carer, guiding Bing through his toddler life, entertaining him and soothing him when Bing faces a problem. Flop is a short orange-skinned creature and is presumably a stuffed peanut toy.
 Sula (voiced by Eve Bentley in the original version, Annabelle Chow in the American English dub) is a brown, female anthropomorphic elephant and one of Bing's best friends. Sula wears a pink and yellow dress with trousers, hot pink socks and golden sparkly shoes. Her favourite toy is Fairy Hippo (as revealed in 'Hearts'), a hippo dressed up as a fairy.
 Amma (voiced by Akiya Henry), is Sula's guardian. Amma runs the creche and park café. The programme's child characters sometimes visit. Amma is a short blue-skinned elephant-like creature and is also presumed to be a stuffed elephant toy.
 Pando (voiced by Shai Portnoy in series 1 and Noah Hicks in series 2 of the original version, Micah Gursoy in the American English dub) is an anthropomorphic male panda who is also Bing's second best friend, and lives next door to him. Pando shares his catchphrase, "Hoppity-voosh! " with Bing. Pando wears a white shirt, belly black sneakers and white briefs. He is often seen wearing yellow shorts, before taking them off at the earliest possible opportunity, remaining in his underwear.
 Padget (voiced by Bryony Hannah in the original version, Molly Wurwand in the American English dub) is Pando's guardian. Padget runs the corner shop near to where Bing lives. Padget can sometimes be spotted out jogging or else driving her yellow tuk-tuk. Padget is a short green-skinned creature, also presumed to be a stuffed animal.
 Coco (voiced by Jocelyn Macnab in the original version, Alivia Clark in the American English dub) is a white anthropomorphic bunny who is Bing's cousin and Charlie's older sister. Coco is the oldest of the child characters at age 10.
 Charlie (voiced by Poppy Hendley), is a white anthropomorphic bunny who is Coco's 1-year-old baby brother and Bing's cousin who cannot talk. Charlie puts everything in his mouth and the others say, "Don't chew it, Charlie!"
 Molly (voiced by Tamsin Greig), is Coco and Charlie's carer. Molly also works as a doctor. Molly is a small red-skinned creature often seen wearing glasses and a white lab coat.
 Nicky (voiced by Xavi Nixon), is a small anthropomorphic brown elephant who is Sula's younger cousin. Nicky wears glasses, an orange t-shirt, blue & white sneakers and blue dungarees. Nicky makes his first appearance in series 2. Nicky is often the source of disagreement between Bing and Sula.

Production
Bing was based on the Bing Bunny book series, written and illustrated by Ted Dewan. Acamar Films acquired the rights to Bing Bunny and produced the programme in conjunction with Brown Bag Films and Tandem Films. The series was developed for CBeebies though initial episodes were viewable at MIPTV.

Episodes

The first series of 78 seven-minute episodes show the "mishaps, mess, energy and wonder of being a relatively new human being". The programme focuses on real-life situations experienced by many toddlers and their parents. Every episode starts off with Flop saying "Round the corner not far away." Whatever Bing is doing at the start of the episode. At the end, Bing summarizes what he has learnt in the episode, with Flop intoning "It's a Bing thing". The second season began airing on CBeebies on 31 October 2019.

Awards and nominations

Other media

Home media
DVDs of the series are released by StudioCanal in the UK. The first DVD "Swing... and other episodes" was released on 31 March 2015 and features 10 episodes - Bye Bye, Swing, Blocks, Ducks, Smoothie, Frog, Car Park, Shadow, Musical Statues, and Voo Voo. A second DVD was released on 15 June 2015 and is titled "Storytime... and other episodes", featuring a further 10 episodes - Storytime, Growing, Atchoo, Hide & Seek, Bake, Train, Say Goodbye, Lost, Picnic, and Balloon.

Merchandise
HarperCollins Children's Books signed a deal with Acamar and The Licensing Company to re-publish the stories to link with the TV programme. The books were re-issued in 2013–14.

Fisher Price have developed a range of Bing toys, which were released in July 2015, including "play sets, figurines, role play items, ride-ons, musical toys, wooden toys, and soft toys", at some point Fisher Price lost the license and now toys are currently manufactured by Golden Bear Toys.

References

External links
Bing on Cbeebies
Bing Bunny

The Bing Store
Bing: Watch, PLay, Learn app
Production website

2014 British television series debuts
2010s British children's television series
2010s British animated television series
2019 British television series endings
British children's animated comedy television series
British computer-animated television series
British preschool education television series
British television shows based on children's books
Irish children's animated comedy television series
Irish preschool education television series
English-language television shows
Animated television series about children
Animated television series about rabbits and hares
CBeebies
Cartoon Network original programming
Cartoonito original programming
Animated preschool education television series
2010s preschool education television series